State Highway 113 (abbreviated SH-113) is a state highway in Pittsburg County, Oklahoma, United States.

Route description
SH-113 begins at Business US-69 north of McAlester. It heads northbound to Indianola, where it turns east and heads to Canadian. It then ends at an interchange with the US-69 freeway.

Junction list

References

External links
SH-113 at OKHighways

113
Transportation in Pittsburg County, Oklahoma